Adolf Stern (real name: Adolf Ernst; June 14, 1835 – April 15, 1907) was a German literary historian and poet.

He was born in Leipzig. He studied at the universities of Leipzig and Jena, and in 1868 was appointed professor of the history of literature in the Königlich-Sächsischen Polytechnikum of Dresden.  His publications include the compilation Fünfzig Jahre deutscher Dichtung (1871); two collections of essays, Aus dem achtzehnten Jahrhundert (1874), Geschichte der neuern Litteratur (seven volumes, 1882–85); Grundriss der allgemeinen Literaturgeschichte (fourth edition, 1906); and editing of Hauff, Herder, and Körner, Sr. His literary works include: Gedichte (1860); fourth edition, 1900); Die Wiedertäufer (1866), stories; the novels Die letzten Humanisten (1880); Camoëns (1887); and Die Ausgestossenen (1911), a fragment.  His selected works appeared in eight volumes (Leipzig, 1908). He died in Dresden.

References
 Adolf Bartels, A. Stern der Dichter und Literaturhistoriker (Dresden, 1905)
 

1835 births
1907 deaths
Academic staff of TU Dresden
German poets
19th-century German historians
Writers from Leipzig
People from the Kingdom of Saxony
German male poets
German male novelists
19th-century poets
19th-century German novelists
19th-century German male writers